Fierté Canada Pride is a Canadian organization, which represents and is composed of organizers of local LGBT pride festivals in Canada, as well as serving as the Canadian chapter (Region 7) of InterPride. Many, but not all, pride festivals in Canada are members of the organization.

The organization's mission is to promote pride events on a national level, through networking, advocacy work, and member education on aspects such as event planning, marketing, sponsorship and media relations.

Organization structure

Fierté Canada Pride is a registered federal not-for-profit organisation that is led by a Board of Directors and an Executive Director. The Board is composed of a President, Vice President of Governance, a Vice President of Membership, a vice President of Human Resources, a Secretary, a Treasurer, a Communications Director, and Directors at Large in various parts of Canada.  FCP has created four Leadership Councils representing Two Spirit, Women, People of Colour trans, non-binary and gender diverse individuals. Councils are independent groups of individuals who are interested in providing feedback to FCP about meaningful inclusion of marginalized communities

History
At its annual general meeting (AGM) in 2015, the organization formally launched Canada Pride/Fierté Canada, a program modelled on WorldPride which will see a different Canadian city host a national Canada Pride festival every two years. The first Canada Pride was held in Montreal, Quebec in 2017, in conjunction with the city's regular Fierté Montréal.

At the 2017 AGM, Pride Winnipeg was selected to host the second edition of Canada Pride/Fierté Canada which will take place May 22–31, 2020. At the AGM, delegates also voted in favour of Calgary Pride hosting the 2018 conference and general meeting.

List of Fierté Canada Prides and National Conferences/AGMs

National Conferences and AGMs

References

External links
Fierté Canada Pride

LGBT non-profit organizations in Canada
LGBT events in Canada
2004 establishments in Canada